Lorna Gaye Goodison CD (born 1 August 1947) is a Jamaican poet, essayist and memoirist, a leading West Indian writer. She is now Professor Emerita, English Language and Literature/Afroamerican and African Studies at the University of Michigan, previously serving as the Lemuel A. Johnson Professor of English and African and Afroamerican Studies. She was appointed Poet Laureate of Jamaica in 2017, succeeding Mervyn Morris. In 2019, she was awarded the Queen's Gold Medal for Poetry.

Biography

Early years
Lorna Gaye Goodison was born in Kingston, Jamaica, on 1 August 1947, her birthday coinciding with Emancipation Day. She was one of nine siblings (who include the award-winning journalist Barbara Gloudon). Goodison was educated at St. Hugh's High School, a leading Anglican high school in Jamaica, and studied at the Jamaica School of Art, before going on to the Art Students League of New York, where she studied under African-American painter Jacob Lawrence. 

As well as painting, Goodison has also written poetry since her teenage years; some early poems appeared anonymously in the Jamaica Gleaner. She has described poetry as "a dominating, intrusive tyrant. It's something I have to do – a wicked force". She states that Derek Walcott was a major influence on her writing. She has also spoken of how Dante impacted on her work.

In her twenties, back in Jamaica, she taught art and worked in advertising and public relations before pursuing a career as a professional writer. She began to publish under her own name in the Jamaica Journal, and to give readings. In the early 1990s Goodison began teaching part of the year at various North American universities, including the University of Toronto and at the University of Michigan, where she was the Lemuel A. Johnson Professor of English and African and Afroamerican Studies. In 2019 she was appointed Writer-in-Residence in the Department of Literatures in English, University of the West Indies, Mona campus.

Writing
Goodison's first book to be published was the 1980 volume of poems Tamarind Season. Tamarind Season was followed in 1986 by I Am Becoming My Mother, for which Goodison received the Commonwealth Writers Prize for the Americas. Her subsequent poetry collections include Heartease (1988) Poems (1989), Selected Poems (1992), To Us, All Flowers Are Roses (1995), Turn Thanks (1999), Guinea Woman (2000), Travelling Mercies (2001), Controlling the Silver (2005), Goldengrove (2006), Oracabessa (2013) and Supplying Salt and Light (2013). Oracabessa won the Poetry category of the 2014 OCM Bocas Prize for Caribbean Literature.

Mother Muse, was published in 2021. Ben Wilkinson wrote in The Guardian: "Her writing is often a celebration of the spirit and tenacity of women; in various ways, Mother Muse ... extends this feature of her work." Mother Muse "orbits around two important 'mother' figures in Jamaican music: Sister Mary Ignatius, the nun who ran Kingston's Alpha Boys School, celebrated for nurturing musical talent; and Anita 'Margarita' Mahfood, a celebrated dancer and lover of ill-fated musician Don Drummond — who was an Alpha Boys alumnus. Other poems contemplate, celebrate, and elegise woman ranging from the famous to the tragic to the unknown."

Goodison has also published three collections of short stories, Baby Mother and the King of Swords (1990), Fool-Fool Rose Is Leaving Labour-in-Vain Savannah (2005), and By Love Possessed (2012).

Her memoir, From Harvey River, was published in 2008, and was featured on BBC Radio 4's Book of the Week in May 2009, read by Doña Croll. The review by Lisa Fugard in The New York Times concluded: "Goodison's praise songs can be found in her many volumes of poetry and now in this loving memoir. It's a legacy that can be traced back to her infancy, when Goodison's mother dipped her finger in sugar and rubbed it under her daughter's tongue, ensuring her the gift of sweet speech."

Goodison's collection of essays, Redemption Ground: Essays and Adventures, was published in 2018 by Myriad Editions – "a gathering of people, voices, stories, and the fruits of great labor", as characterised by SX Salon. The book featured in The Observer as one of "20 classic books by writers of colour", being chosen by Margaret Busby.

Her work has appeared widely in magazines, has been translated into many languages and over the past 25 years has been included in such anthologies as Daughters of Africa (1992), The Norton Anthology of Modern and Contemporary Poetry (2003), the HarperCollins World Reader, the Vintage Book of Contemporary World Poetry, the Norton Anthology of World Masterpieces, and Longman Masters of British Literature (2006).

Poet and literary scholar Edward Baugh says "one of Goodison’s achievements is that her poetry inscribes the Jamaican sensibility and culture on the text of the world". Together with issues of home and exile, her work addresses the power of art to explore and reconcile opposites and contradictions in the Caribbean historical experience. Kei Miller notes, "Primarily a poet, Goodison hasn’t been afraid of crossing the fence into other genres: she has written short stories and a much-celebrated memoir. ...I suspect she still isn't as celebrated as she really ought to be because there simply doesn’t exist the perfect critical language to talk about what she is doing, the risks she is taking, and why exactly they succeed."

Other creative activity
She has exhibited her paintings internationally, and her own artwork is usually featured on the covers of her books.

Since 2017 Goodison has worked with dub poet and martial arts trainer Cherry Natural (born Marcia Wedderburn) to host a series of summer workshops pairing poetry and self-defence for girls aged from nine to 17, held at the Institute of Jamaica.

Personal life 
One of nine siblings – including journalist, author, playwright Barbara Gloudon (1935–2022) – Goodison is married to author and retired English literature professor J. Edward (Ted) Chamberlin and they live in Halfmoon Bay, British Columbia.

Recognition
In 2013 Goodison was awarded the Jamaican national honour of the Order of Distinction in the rank of Commander (CD), "for outstanding achievements in Literature and Poetry". In 2017 Goodison was invested as the second official poet laureate of Jamaica, after Mervyn Morris, becoming the first woman to hold the title. She marked her first Emancipation Day in the role with a poem "In Celebration of Emancipation", which commemorates the end of enslavement of African peoples in Jamaica. She has said: "I don't think it is an accident that I was born on the first of August, and I don't think it was an accident that I was given the gift of poetry, so I take that to mean that I am to write about those people and their condition, and I will carry a burden about what they endured and how they prevailed until the day I die."

In 2018 Yale University announced Goodison as one of eight recipient of the Windham–Campbell Literature Prize, honouring writers for their literary achievement or promise and awarding them each a US$165,000 individual prize to support their writing. In 2019 was a recipient of the Queen's Gold Medal for Poetry, which was presented to her at Buckingham Palace in March 2020.
In 2020 Goodison was elected to the American Academy of Arts and Sciences. In 2022 she received an honorary doctorate (Doctor of Letters) from Durham University.

Awards
1986: Commonwealth Writers Prize for the Americas, for I Am Becoming My Mother
1999: Musgrave Gold Medal by the Institute of Jamaica for contributions to literature
2013: Jamaican Order of Distinction in the rank of Commander (CD)
2014: OCM Bocas Prize for Poetry, for Oracabessa
2017–2020: Poet laureate of Jamaica
2018: Windham–Campbell Literature Prize
2019: Honorary doctorate from University of Toronto
2019: Queen's Gold Medal for Poetry
2020: American Academy of Arts and Sciences
2022: Honorary doctorate from Durham University

Bibliography

Poetry collections
 Tamarind Season (Institute of Jamaica, 1980)
 I Am Becoming My Mother (New Beacon Books, 1986, ; winner of Commonwealth Writers' Prize, Americas region)
 Heartease (New Beacon Books, 1988)
 Poems (Research Institute for the Study of Man/CommonWealth of Letters, 1989)
 Selected Poems (University of Michigan Press, 1992)
 To Us, All Flowers Are Roses (University of Illinois Press, 1995)
 Turn Thanks (University of Illinois Press, 1999)
 Guinea Woman: New and Selected Poems (Carcanet, 2000)
 Travelling Mercies (McClelland & Stewart, 2001)
 Controlling the Silver (University of Illinois Press, 2005)
 Goldengrove: New and Selected Poems (Carcanet, 2006)
 Oracabessa (Carcanet, 2013)
 Supplying Salt and Light (McClelland & Stewart, 2013)
 Collected Poems (2nd edition) (Carcanet, 2017)
 Mother Muse (Carcanet, 2021)

Short story collections
 Baby Mother and the King of Swords (Longman, 1990)
 Fool-Fool Rose Is Leaving Labour-in-Vain Savannah (Ian Randle Publishers, 2005)
 By Love Possessed (Amistad Press, 2012)

Memoir
 From Harvey River: A Memoir of My Mother and Her Island (Atlantic Books, 2009)

Essay collection 
 Redemption Ground: Essays and Adventures (Myriad Editions, 2018)

References

Further reading
 Alexander, Mary L. "Woman as Creator/Destroyer in Three Poems of Lorna Goodison", Caribbean Studies, 1994.
Kwame, Dawes, "Lorna Goodison", Talk Yuh Talk: Interviews with Anglophone Caribbean Poets, Charlottesville & London: University Press of Virginia, 2001, pp. 99–107.
 Jenkins, Lee M. "Penelope's Web: Una Marson, Lorna Goodison, M. NourbeSe Philip" in The Language of Caribbean Poetry: Boundaries of Expression, University Press of Florida, 2004.
 Kuwabong, Dannabang. "The Mother as Archetype of Self: A Poetics of Matrilineage in the Poetry of Claire Harris and Lorna Goodison", Ariel, 1999.
 McNeilly, Kevin. "World Jazz 5: Lorna Goodison Leaves Off Miles Davis", Canadian Literature, 2004.
 Narain, Denise. "Lorna Goodison: delivering the word", in Contemporary Caribbean Women's Poetry: Making Style, Routledge, 2002.
 Pollard, Velma. "Mothertongue: Voices in the Writing of Olive Senior and Lorna Goodison", in Motherlands, ed. Susheila Nasta, Rutgers University Press, 1992.

External links
 The Lorna Goodison Papers are held at the Thomas Fisher Rare Book Library, University of Toronto.
"Lorna Goodison: Jamaican Poet Laureate", In the Studio, BBC World Service, 29 August 2017
Caribbean Review of Books index to material on Goodison.
"Lorna Goodison" at The Poetry Archive.
 "Canadian poet Lorna Goodison shares the books that inspired her life and work", CBC Books, 17 June 2020.

1947 births
20th-century Jamaican poets
20th-century Jamaican women writers
21st-century Jamaican women writers
Commanders of the Order of Distinction
Fellows of the American Academy of Arts and Sciences
International Writing Program alumni
Jamaican women artists
Jamaican women poets
Living people
Poets laureate
Recipients of the Musgrave Medal
University of Michigan faculty
University of the West Indies academics